Paramecium bursaria is a species of ciliate found in marine and brackish waters. It has a mutualistic endosymbiotic relationship with green algae called Zoochlorella. The algae live inside the Paramecium in its cytoplasm and provide it with food, while the Paramecium provides the algae with movement and protection. P. bursaria is  80-150 μm long, with a wide oral groove, two contractile vacuoles, and a single micronucleus as well as a single macronucleus. P. bursaria is the only species of Paramecium that forms symbiotic relationships with algae, and it is often used in biology classrooms both as an example of a protozoan and also as an example of symbiosis.

A transcriptome sequence is determined.

References

Further reading

External links
Pictures of P. bursaria as well as a short description

Oligohymenophorea
Species described in 1831
Endosymbiotic events
Taxa named by Christian Gottfried Ehrenberg